The Society for Promoting Christian Knowledge (SPCK) is a UK-based Christian charity. Founded in 1698 by Thomas Bray, it has worked for over 300 years to increase awareness of the Christian faith in the UK and worldwide.

The SPCK is the oldest Anglican mission organisation in the world, though it is now more ecumenical in outlook and publishes books for a wide range of Christian denominations. It is currently the leading publisher of Christian books in the United Kingdom and the third oldest independent publisher in the UK.

Mission 
The SPCK has a vision of a world in which everyone is transformed by Christian knowledge. Its mission is to lead the way in creating books and resources that help everyone to make sense of faith.

Education has always been a core part of SPCK's mission.

History

Foundation 
On 8 March 1698, Rev. Thomas Bray met a small group of friends, including Sir Humphrey Mackworth, Colonel Maynard Colchester, Lord Guilford and John Hooke at Lincoln's Inn. These men were concerned by what they saw as the "growth in vice and immorality" in Britain at the time which was owing to the "gross ignorance of the principles of the Christian religion". They were also committed to promoting "religion and learning in the plantations abroad".

They resolved to meet regularly to devise strategies to increase their knowledge of Anglican Christianity. They decided that these aims could best be achieved by publishing and distributing Christian literature and encouraging Christian education at all levels.

SPCK was involved in tackling a number of social and political issues of the time. It actively campaigned for penal reform, provided for the widows and children of clergy who died whilst overseas and provided basic education for slaves in the Caribbean.

One of the key priorities for Bray and his friends was to build libraries in market towns. In its first two hundred years, the Society founded many charity schools for poor children aged 7-11. The Society also provided teacher training.

Evangelism overseas 
SPCK has worked overseas since its foundation. The initial focus was the British colonies in the Americas. Libraries were established for the use of clergy and their parishioners, and books were frequently shipped across the Atlantic throughout the 18th century. In 1709, SPCK sent a printing press and trained printer to Tranquebar in East India to assist in the production of the first translation of the Bible into Tamil. This was accomplished by the German Lutheran missionaries Bartholomaeus Ziegenbalg and Heinrich Pluetschau from the Danish-Halle Mission.

As the British Empire grew in the 19th century, SPCK supported the planting of new churches around the world. Funds were provided for church buildings, schools, theological training colleges, and to provide chaplains for the ships taking emigrants to their new homes. While the SPCK supported the logistics of church planting and provided resources for theological learning, by the 19th century it did not often send missionaries overseas. Instead, this work was passed to other organizations such as its sister society the United Society for the Propagation of the Gospel (USPG), which was also founded by Bray. In Ireland, the APCK was founded in 1792 to work alongside the Church of Ireland; in south India the Indian Society for Promoting Christian Knowledge was established to support the Anglican missions in that region and is affiliated with SPCK.

During the twentieth century, SPCK's overseas mission concentrated on providing free study literature for those in a number of ministerial training colleges around the world, especially in Africa. The International Study Guide series was provided, free of charge, to theological training colleges across the world. They can still be purchased from the SPCK website, although the focus of SPCK's worldwide mission is now on developing the African Theological Network Press.

Supporting the Church of England 
From the late 1800s to the early 20th century, SPCK ran a Training College for Lay Workers on Commercial Road in Stepney Green, London. This was set up to provide a theological education for working-class men, with the aim of better helping clergy to conduct services. It was also anticipated that with a firmer understanding of the Bible, theology and the values of the Anglican church, these men might be able to instruct their own communities.

Throughout the 20th century, the SPCK offered support to ordinands in the Anglican church. These were men in training to become priests in the Church of England, who had fallen upon hard times and may have otherwise been unable to continue their studies. Today, this support continues through the Richards Trust and the Ordinands Library app.

Publishing and distribution 
Thomas Bray believed passionately in the power of the printed word. From its earliest days, the SPCK commissioned tracts and pamphlets, making it the third-oldest publishing house in England. (Only the Oxford and Cambridge University Presses have existed longer.) Very early on, SPCK member George Sale translated The Koran into English and this was published in 1734 by the SPCK, much to the praise of Voltaire.

Throughout the 18th century, SPCK was by far the largest producer of Christian literature in Britain. The range of its output was considerable — from pamphlets aimed at specific groups such as farmers, prisoners, soldiers, seamen, servants and slave-owners, to more general works on subjects such as baptism, confirmation, Holy Communion, the Prayer Book, and private devotion. Increasingly, more substantial books were also published, both on Christian subjects and, from the 1830s, on general educational topics as well.

SPCK's early publications were distributed through a network of supporters who received books and tracts to sell or give away in their own localities. Large quantities of Christian literature were provided for the Navy, and the Society actively encouraged the formation of parish libraries, to help both clergy and laity. By the 19th century, members had organized local district committees, many of which established small book depots — which at one time numbered over four hundred. These were overseen by central committees such as the Committee of General Literature and Education. In 1899, the addresses of their "depositories" in London were given as Northumberland Avenue, W.C.; Charing Cross, W.C. and 43 Queen Victoria Street, E.C.. Six years later, in edition 331, the depository was closed at Charing Cross, but a new one added at 129, North Street in Brighton.

In the 1930s, a centrally coordinated network of SPCK Bookshops was established, offering a wide range of books from many different publishers. At its peak, the SPCK bookshop chain consisted of 40 shops in the UK and 20 overseas. The latter were gradually passed into local ownership during the 1960s and 1970s.

Holy Trinity Church, Marylebone, Westminster, London is a former Anglican church, built in 1828 by Sir John Soane. By the 1930s, it had fallen into disuse and in 1936 was used by the newly founded Penguin Books company to store books. A children's slide was used to deliver books from the street into the large crypt. In 1937, Penguin moved out to Harmondsworth, and the Society for Promoting Christian Knowledge moved in. It was their headquarters until 2004, when it moved to London Diocesan House in Causton Street, Pimlico. The bookshop moved to Tufton Street, Westminster, in 2003.

On 1 November 2006, St Stephen the Great Charitable Trust (SSG) took over the bookshops but continued to trade under the SPCK name, under licence from SPCK. That licence was withdrawn in October 2007. However, some shops continued trading as SPCK Bookshops without licence until the SSG operation was closed down in 2009.

Publishing 
The SPCK's publishing team produces around 80 titles per year, for audiences from a wide range of Christian traditions and none. The SPCK publishes under three main imprints:

SPCK 
SPCK Publishing is a market leader in the areas of theology and Christian spirituality. At present, key authors for SPCK include the Anglican New Testament scholar N. T. Wright, the former Archbishop of Canterbury Rowan Williams, Paula Gooder and Alister McGrath. Recent additions to SPCK's list include Guvna B, and Ben Cooley, founder of Hope for Justice.

SPCK is also increasingly gaining recognition in the secular space in genres such as history and leadership. SPCK represent authors such as Terry Waite, Melvyn Bragg and Janina Ramirez.

IVP 
SPCK merged with Inter-Varsity Press (IVP) in 2015. IVP maintains its own board of trustees and editorial board. Key authors for IVP include John Stott, Don Carson, Amy Orr-Ewing and Emma Scrivener.

Lion Hudson 
SPCK purchased Lion Hudson in 2021.

Marylebone House 
In 2014, SPCK launched its fiction imprint, Marylebone House, which publishes a range of contemporary and historical fiction, short stories and clerical crime mysteries, with Christian characters and Christian themes.

Diffusion Prison Fiction 
SPCK also owns the imprint Diffusion, which has published 12 titles especially commissioned for adults who struggle to read. These titles are divided into two series, "Star" and "Diamond". Star books are written for adults who are new to reading and need to improve their very basic skills, while the Diamond series is more appropriate for learners who want to develop their reading confidence further. All of the books are written with engaging plots, suitable for adults, but in a style and typeface that is accessible to people with very basic literacy skills.

SPCK provides these books for free to prisons including to individual prisoners, prison libraries and prison reading groups. This is done with the aim of addressing two major causes of re-offending: lack of employment on release and lack of support from family and friends. At the end of each chapter, the Diffusion books contain questions which can be discussed in a reading group, thereby developing verbal communication and social skills. These questions focus on developing empathy by asking questions like "what would it feel like to be in that character's position?" and encourage self-reflection by asking "how does this example apply to my own life?".

By the end of 2018, the SPCK had sent Diffusion books to 70% of prisons in the UK. In 2018 alone, it sent out over 6,500 books.

Assemblies website 
In 1999, the SPCK created the assemblies website as a new way in which to promote Christian knowledge amongst the youth of Britain. The aim of the assemblies website is to provide teachers with easy access to free resources, empowering them to deliver high-quality assemblies that make their pupils explore faith and their own beliefs.

Since it was created, the assemblies website has become a web community where experienced teachers and youth leaders can share their ideas, assembly scripts and tips and tricks for delivering engaging assemblies.

There are now over 1500 assembly scripts on the website. Each month, SPCK commissions 16 new assemblies; 8 for primary schools and 8 for secondary schools. In addition to these, 'rapid response' assemblies may be added within 24 hours of momentous world events. Many assemblies focus on Christian themes, but other address pastoral issues common within schools. The Festivals of World Religions section also encourages awareness of other religions and enables teachers to celebrate children of other faiths.

Every month, the assemblies website attracts over 50,000 unique visitors and the most popular assemblies are viewed over 10,000 times.

In 2018, the SPCK also redeveloped its Welsh language offering, leading to a bank of 600 Welsh language assembly scripts.

The African Theological Network Press 
Together with the Akrofi-Christaller Institute of Theology, Mission and Culture, the Jesuit Historical Institute in Africa and Missio Africanus, the SPCK founded the African Theological Network Press (the ATNP). The ATNP publishes theology written by Africans on topics that matter to African Christians.

The aim of the ATNP is to be "an ecumenical press serving the church in Africa and the Diaspora through affordable, high-quality, scholarly publications accessible on the continent and globally" The ATNP is a centralised commissioning and editorial unit, based in Nairobi. The material is distributed across Africa to be printed locally, which avoids the problems of localised publishing where books rarely make it outside the country in which they are published.

The ATNP seeks to mitigate the dependence of African theological study and teaching on publications from the global North.

SSPCK in Scotland 
The Scottish sister society, the Society in Scotland for Propagating Christian Knowledge (SSPCK), was formed by royal charter in 1709 as a separate organisation with the purpose of founding schools "where religion and virtue might be taught to young and old" in the Scottish Highlands and other "uncivilised" areas of the country. It was intended to counter the threat of Catholic missionaries and of growing Highland Jacobitism. The SSPCK had five schools by 1711, 25 by 1715, 176 by 1758 and 189 by 1808, by which time 13,000 pupils were attending.

According to John Lorne Campbell, "Too often Scottish writers, and particularly writers on the history of the Scottish Highlands, have confused 'education' with 'Calvinist indoctrination', such as was given in the S.P.C.K. schools in the Scottish Highlands and Islands, where the Westminster Confession of Faith, the Shorter Catechism, Vincent's Catechism, the Protestant's Resolutions, Pool's Dialogues, and Guthrie's Trials, all in English, formed the bulk of an unattractive list of school books.".

At first, the SSPCK avoided using the Gaelic language, with the result that pupils ended up learning by rote without understanding what they were reading. SSPCK rules from 1720 required the teaching of literacy and numeracy "but not any Latin or Irish" (then a common term for Gaelic on both sides of the Irish Sea), and the Society boasted "that barbarity and the Irish language ... are almost rooted out" by their teaching. In 1753, an act of the Society forbade students "either in the schoolhouse or when playing about the doors thereof to speak Erse, under pain of being chastised".

In 1741, the SSPCK introduced the Gaelic–English vocabulary compiled by the poet Alasdair Mac Mhaighstir Alasdair, then, in 1767, introduced a New Testament designed with facing pages of Gaelic and English texts for both languages to be read alongside one another, with more success. In 1766, it allowed its Highland schools to use Gaelic alongside English as languages of instruction. In 1790, a Society preacher still insisted that English monolingualism was a Society goal and a decade later Society schools continued to use corporal punishment against students speaking Gaelic. In the early 19th century, the Society activity declined. Its educational work was taken over by the Gaelic Societies of Edinburgh, Glasgow and Inverness.

Prominent members 
 James Catford, chair of trustees
 Sam Richardson, CEO
 Bishop John Pritchard, former chair of trustees

Notes

Further reading
Books
 Allen, William Osborne Bird & McClure, Edmund (1898) Two Hundred Years: the History of the Society for Promoting Christian Knowledge, 1698–1898 online
 Clarke, W. K. Lowther (1959) A History of the SPCK. London: SPCK
 Smout, T. C. (1985), A History of the Scottish People, Fontana Press, 

Articles
 Grigg, John A., "'How This Shall Be Brought About': The Development of the SSPCK's American Policy," Itinerario (Leiden), 32 (no. 3, 2008), 43–60.
 Nishikawa, Sugiko. "The SPCK in defence of protestant minorities in Early Eighteenth-Century Europe." Journal of Ecclesiastical History 56.04 (2005): 730–748.
 Simon, Joan. "From charity school to workhouse in the 1720s: The SPCK and Mr Marriott's solution." History of education 17#2 (1988): 113–129.
 Threinen, Norman J. (1988) Friedrich Michael Ziegenhagen (1694–1776). German Lutheran Pietist in the English court. In: Lutheran Theological Review 12, pp. 56–94.
 Withrington, D. J. "The SPCK and Highland Schools in Mid-Eighteenth Century." Scottish Historical Review 41.132 (1962): 89–99. in JSTOR

Journals
 Theology
 Readings In Indian Christian Theology

External links

Websites
 SPCK Publishing, official website for the Society for Promoting Christian Knowledge
 The Society for Promoting Christian Knowledge/USA official website
 Education and Anglicisation: The Policy of the SSPCK toward the education of The Highlander, 1709–1825 by Charles W. J. Withers
 SPCK SSG: News, Notes & Info
 Society in Scotland for Propagating Christian Knowledge official website of the SSPCK
 Assemblies Assemblies official website

Church of England missionary societies
Anglicanism
Bible societies
Christian literature
Christian organizations established in the 17th century
Christian publishing companies
Educational book publishing companies
History of education
Organisations based in the City of Westminster
Religion in the City of Westminster
Religious organizations established in 1698
1698 establishments in England